Tyrosine-protein kinase Lyn is a protein that in humans is encoded by the LYN gene.

Lyn is a member of the Src family of protein tyrosine kinases, which is mainly expressed in hematopoietic cells, in neural tissues liver, and adipose tissue. In various hematopoietic cells, Lyn has emerged as a key enzyme involved in the regulation of cell activation. In these cells, a small amount of LYN is associated with cell surface receptor proteins, including the B cell antigen receptor (BCR), CD40, or CD19. The abbreviation Lyn is derived from Lck/Yes novel tyrosine kinase, Lck and Yes also being members of the Src kinase family.

Function 

Lyn has been described to have an inhibitory role in myeloid lineage proliferation. Following engagement of the B cell receptors, Lyn undergoes rapid phosphorylation and activation. LYN activation triggers a cascade of signaling events mediated by Lyn phosphorylation of tyrosine residues within the immunoreceptor tyrosine-based activation motifs (ITAM) of the receptor proteins, and subsequent recruitment and activation of other kinases including Syk, phosholipase Cγ2 (PLCγ2) and phosphatidyl inositol-3 kinase. These kinases provide activation signals, which play critical roles in proliferation, Ca2+ mobilization and cell differentiation.  Lyn plays an essential role in the transmission of inhibitory signals through phosphorylation of tyrosine residues within the immunoreceptor tyrosine-based inhibitory motifs (ITIM) in regulatory proteins such as CD22, PIR-B and FCγRIIb1. Their ITIM phosphorylation subsequently leads to recruitment and activation of phosphatases such as SHIP-1 and SHP-1, which further downmodulate signaling pathways, attenuate cell activation and can mediate tolerance.  In B cells, Lyn sets the threshold of cell signaling and maintains the balance between activation and inhibition. Lyn thus functions as a rheostat that modulates signaling rather than as a binary on-off switch. HSP90 inhibitor NVP-BEP800 has been described to affect stability of LYN kinase and growth of B-cell acute lymphoblastic leukemias through inhibition of the NF-kappaB signaling. 

LYN is reported to be a key signal mediator for estrogen-dependent suppression of human osteoclast differentiation, survival, and function. Lyn has also been implicated to have a role in the insulin signaling pathway.  Activated Lyn phosphorylates insulin receptor substrate 1 (IRS1).  This phosphorylation of IRS1 leads to an increase in translocation of Glut-4 to the cell membrane and increased glucose utilization.  In turn, activation of the insulin receptor has been shown to increase autophosphorylation of Lyn suggesting a possible feedback loop.
The insulin secretagogue, glimepiride (Amaryl®) activates Lyn in adipocytes via the disruption of lipid rafts.  This indirect Lyn activation may modulate the extrapancreatic glycemic control activity of glimepiride.  Tolimidone (MLR-1023) is a small molecule allosteric activator of lyn kinase with an EC50 of 63 nM that is currently under Phase 2a investigation for Type II diabetes.  In June, 2016, the sponsor of these studies, Melior Discovery, announced positive results from their Phase 2a study with tolimidone in diabetic patients, and the continuation of additional clinical studies.

Lyn has been shown to protect against hepatocellular apoptosis and promote liver regeneration through the preservation of hepatocellular mitochondrial integrity.

Several investigators have shown the role of lyn kinase in different aspects of pulmonary function.   Lyn activation in pulmonary epithelium has been shown to be important in improving pulmonary barrier integrity and to reduce edema.  Additional evidence suggest that lyn activation in alveolar phagocytes improves phagocytosis of bacteria and reduces pulmonary infection.    Finally, other research has found that lyn activation reduces pulmonary hypersecretion of mucus.

Pathology 

Much of the current knowledge about Lyn has emerged from studies of genetically manipulated mice. Lyn deficient mice display a phenotype that includes splenomegaly, a dramatic increase in numbers of myeloid progenitors and monocyte/macrophage tumors.  Biochemical analysis of cells from these mutants revealed that Lyn is essential in establishing ITIM-dependent inhibitory signaling and for activation of specific protein tyrosine phosphatases within myeloid cells.

Mice that expressed a hyperactive Lyn allele were tumor free and displayed no propensity toward hematological malignancy.  These mice have reduced numbers of conventional B lymphocytes, down-regulated surface immunoglobulin M and costimulatory molecules, and elevated numbers of B1a B cells.  With age these animals developed a glomerulonephritis phenotype associated with a 30% reduction in life expectancy.

Interactions 
LYN has been shown to interact with:

 BCAR1, 
 CD117, 
 CD22, 
 Cdk1, 
 DOK1, 
 EPOR 
 GPVI, 
 INPP5D, 
 IRS1, 
 LCP2, 
 MUC1,
 NEDD9, 
 PLCG2, 
 PPP1R15A, 
 PTPRC, 
 Syk,
 TRPV4,
 UNC119,

See also 
 Lyn-CD22-SHP-1 pathway

References

Further reading

External links 
 

EC 2.7.10
Genes on human chromosome 8
Tyrosine kinases